Five Forks, North Carolina may refer to:
Five Forks, Person County, North Carolina, an unincorporated community in North Carolina
Five Forks, Robeson County, North Carolina, an unincorporated community
King, North Carolina (formerly called Five Forks) a city in Stokes and Forsyth counties

See also
Five Forks (disambiguation)